was a village located in Mima District, Tokushima Prefecture, Japan.

As of 2003, the village had an estimated population of 1,414 and a density of 14.45 persons per km². The total area was 97.88 km².

On March 1, 2005, Ichiu, along with the towns of Handa and Sadamitsu (all from Mima District), was merged to create the town of Tsurugi.

Geography
Ichiu is dominated by steep and relatively tall mountains.  The town is situated on the upper part of the Sadamitsu River.

Education
Ichiu has one junior high school, and one elementary school, Komi Elementary.  Due to lack of students, Ichiu Junior High School closed in spring 2010.

Sightseeing
Ichiu is known as "The Land of Giant Trees," and is home to a number of large, old trees.  "Akabane Taishi no Enoki" is the oldest hackberry tree in Japan at an estimated 800 years old; it has a circumference of 8.7 meters.  Ichiu is also home to Shikoku's oldest horse chestnut and Japanese red pine.
Dogama is a series of pools, rapids and waterfalls formed as the Sadamitsu river flows through a slot canyon.  It is notable for the deep blue-green color of its water.
Mount Tsurugi and the Iya Valley may be accessed via Route 438 through Ichiu.

Transportation
Japanese National Route 438 is the main road in Ichiu.  Ichiu is served by local buses.

External links
 Tsurugi official website (in Japanese)
 Map of Ichiu's large trees (in Japanese)

Dissolved municipalities of Tokushima Prefecture
Tsurugi, Tokushima